Satish Chandra Basumatary (16 November 1901 – 16 November 1974) was an Indian Bodo poet, dramatist, Social worker and the second president of Bodo Sahitya Sabha. He is a pioneer people of Bibar era, the age of renaissance of Bodo literature. He is credited with helping establish Bodo Brahma Dharma. He was also the editor of first Bodo magazine Bibar in 1924.
He was honoured with Mengnw Rwngwi Jwhwlao title after his death.

Early life
He was born on 16 November 1901 at Balukmari village in Dhubri district (present Kokrajhar) into Bodo family Thandaram Basumatary and Khowlou Basumatary. He started schooling from Dhubri High School, later went to Cotton College, Guwahati.
He died on 16 November 1974.

Works
Drama
 Rani Laimuti (1924)
 Naifinjaywi
 Bikhani Or
 Dwrswn Jwhwlao (2005)

References

Bodo people
1901 births
1974 deaths